Vladyslav Nasibulin (born 6 July 1989) is a Ukrainian professional football defender.

Career
He is product of FC Metalurh Donetsk and FC Shakhtar Donetsk sport schools.

Nasibulin was loaned to FC Illichivets Mariupol in Ukrainian Premier League from 6 June 2010.

References

External links 

1989 births
Living people
People from Debaltseve
Sportspeople from Donetsk Oblast
Ukrainian footballers
Association football midfielders
Ukrainian expatriate footballers
Expatriate footballers in Belarus
FC Shakhtar Donetsk players
FC Shakhtar-3 Donetsk players
FC Mariupol players
FC Zirka Kropyvnytskyi players
FC Poltava players
FC Minsk players
FC Hirnyk-Sport Horishni Plavni players
FC Olimpiya Savyntsi players
Ukrainian expatriate sportspeople in Belarus